Rinorea keayi is a species of plant in the Violaceae family. It is found in Cameroon and Nigeria. It is threatened by habitat loss.

References

keayi
Near threatened plants
Taxonomy articles created by Polbot